The Bulaka River languages are a pair of closely related Papuan languages, Yelmek and Maklew, on the Bulaka River in Indonesian West Papua. They are ethnically Yab (Jab); their speech is Yabga (Jabga).

Languages
Yelmek is spoken west of Merauke, between the Digul River and Mbian River, (from north to south) in the villages of Wanam, Bibikem, Woboyo, and Dodalim. 

Maklew is spoken in Welbuti village. The former two villages are located in Ilwayab subdistrict, and the latter three in Tubang subdistrict.

Classification
The two languages are transparently related.

Ross (2005) tentatively included them in the proposed Trans-Fly – Bulaka River family, but Usher, who reconstructs that family, does not connect Bulaka River to any other language family.

Proto-language

Phonology
Usher (2014) reconstructs the consonant inventory as follows.
Although the modern inventories of Yelmek and Maklew are nearly identical, they lack a one-to-one correspondence. Maklew in particular has been heavily influenced by Marind, and participates in a number of sound changes that occurred in that language. Usher posits:
j for Yelmek j ~ Maklew s (→ [z] in the Jab dialect of Yelmek; also found in loans from Marind /j/, which in some dialects is [hʲ])
w for Yelmek w ~ Maklew h (also found in loans from Marind /w/, which in some dialects is [hʷ])
ɣ for Yelmek ŋ ~ Maklew h (→ [g] in the Jab dialect of Yelmek; Makelew /h/ also found in loans from Marind /ɣ/, which in the central dialects becomes [h])
and, in loan words, mostly from Marind, 
s for Yelmek t ~ Maklew s (→ [ts] is Jab).

In addition, there is a set of correspondences between alveolars in Yelmek and velars in Maklew (n~ŋ, t~k, d~g). Usher transcribes these as a series of palatal consonants (*ɲ *c *ɟ), but this is merely a typographic convenience. The phonetic forms are not easily recoverable, but most instances (8 out of 10) are followed by *e, suggesting that there was a vocal component. Usher suggests that *ɲ *c *ɟ might actually have been  *niV *tiV *diV or *ŋiV *kiV *giV, none of which occur in the reconstructions despite the high frequency of the sequence *iV otherwise. The expected sequences *itV and *ikV also do not occur, so it's possible that *ɲ *c *ɟ reflect all three of these series, rather than a fourth place of articulation. 

{| 
|*m || *n || *ɲ (= *{n|ŋ}i/_V?) || *ŋ
|-
|*p || *t || *c (= *{t|k}i/_V?) || *k
|-
|*b || *d || *ɟ (= *{d|g}i/_V?) || *g
|-
| || [*s] || || 
|-
|*w || *l || *j || *ɣ
|}

{| 
|*i ||  || *u
|-
|*e || (*ə) || *o
|-
| || *a || 
|}

The reconstruction of *ə is not firm, at least partly because the transcribed data is often unreliable. 

There are vowel sequences of *iV and *uV. These might have been reconstructed as **jV and **wV, with no vowel sequences in the proto-language, but that analysis would require changing *w and *j in the consonant table above to **β and **ʝ, disinct from **w and **j, resulting in a larger set of consonants and an odd inventory of fricatives.

Pronouns
Usher (2020) reconstructs the pronouns as:
{| 
! !!sg!!pl
|-
!1
|*ŋ[e]l ||*ŋag
|-
!2
|*au (?) ||*ale (?)
|-
!3
|*eb ||*em[e]l	
|}

Lexicon
Proto-Bulaka River lexical reconstructions by Usher (2014) are:

{| class="wikitable sortable"
! gloss !! Proto-Bulaka River
|-
| afraid || *oio
|-
| ankle || *boto
|-
| ant || *kani[a/e]
|-
| ashes || *kab
|-
| ask about || *lig(-)
|-
| ask for || *liw
|-
| back || *uele
|-
| bamboo || *biol
|-
| banana || *okal
|-
| bandicoot || *jowoli
|-
| bathe || *jale
|-
| be (future) || *ŋaiak
|-
| be hungry || *ɣi
|-
| beach || *uelo
|-
| big || *bala-
|-
| bitter || *ipa
|-
| blood || *ewlek[e]
|-
| blunt/dull || *map
|-
| body/chest || *agal
|-
| bone/shin || *pu
|-
| branch || *kaka
|-
| breadfruit || *joko
|-
| break (rope) || *[a]ŋeme
|-
| break (wood) || *maɣe
|-
| breast || *momo
|-
| breath || *waku
|-
| bush/forest || *golu
|-
| canoe || *imo
|-
| cassowary || *owi
|-
| child/offspring || *iaŋ
|-
| coconut || *mi[a/o]
|-
| coconut shell || *apina
|-
| cold || *ioɣ[a]
|-
| cough/sneeze || *ŋot[o]
|-
| crocodile || *iaua[ŋ]
|-
| crooked/turn || *meŋ
|-
| dark/black || *ɟewi
|-
| (day)light || *owo
|-
| deep || *dam
|-
| dig || *k[o]uak
|-
| dog || *num
|-
| dream || *ŋeɣe
|-
| drink/suck || *[a]ŋ[e]
|-
| dry || *ua-
|-
| ear || *opo-kolo
|-
| earthquake || *ŋ[a/o]ɣum[o]
|-
| enemy || *kui
|-
| excrement || *de, *gauo
|-
| eye/face || *opo
|-
| feather || *papa
|-
| fence || *molo
|-
| fire || *ace
|-
| fish || *dem, *dam
|-
| fly (n.) || *uoli
|-
| fly (v.) || *mu
|-
| foot/leg || *uodo
|-
| forehead || *cule
|-
| fruit || *noma
|-
| go up || *ukal
|-
| good/true || *ŋama-
|-
| grab/hold || *[a]ɣep[e]
|-
| grandparent || *kaga
|-
| hard || *kakeie
|-
| hear || *[i]ŋe
|-
| hit/smash || *pliaɣ
|-
| hole || *kolo
|-
| hot/sharp || *dimo
|-
| house || *ebi
|-
| husband || *ebVwe
|-
| imperative || *ia-
|-
| intransitive || *ŋo-
|-
| kill || *gul-
|-
| knowledge || *uowka
|-
| kunai grass || *uoka
|-
| laugh || *ŋuw
|-
| leaf || *op
|-
| lie down/sleep || *ku
|-
| light (weight) || *popu-
|-
| lightning || *melVm
|-
| lime/white || *mVlino
|-
| long || *tipu-
|-
| louse || *dobuna
|-
| mountain || *uomal
|-
| mouth/door || *uwo
|-
| mucus || *em
|-
| name || *ŋaɟel[e]
|-
| neck || *ua[n/l]
|-
| negative || *ma
|-
| net || *apija
|-
| new || *ŋaluo-
|-
| night || *ui
|-
| now/today || *ŋop[i]
|-
| oblique || *el ~ *ol
|-
| old (thing) || *poto-
|-
| older sibling || *ɲena
|-
| one || *ŋuka
|-
| path || *came
|-
| penis || *mu
|-
| person || *ŋuwa
|-
| pig || *milom
|-
| plait || *ɣo
|-
| plant (v.) || *[e]ule
|-
| possessive || *a[u]-
|-
| rain || *maŋ
|-
| rib(s) || *mel
|-
| ripe || *ŋewe
|-
| rope || *del
|-
| run/run away || *jeme
|-
| sago stems || *buka
|-
| saliva || *wVlo
|-
| see || *[a]b[e]
|-
| shoot || *to
|-
| short || *tama-
|-
| sick/ill || *dogo
|-
| sit || *ma[n/d]
|-
| sleep || *opula
|-
| small || *wVti-
|-
| smoke || *acaja
|-
| snake || *gumolo
|-
| soft/weak || *ieg(ieg)
|-
| sole || *mulo
|-
| sour || *[a]bowol
|-
| speech || *gaga
|-
| spine || *ieŋo
|-
| steal || *ɟepe
|-
| stone || *mat[e]
|-
| stone axe || *iebu
|-
| straight || *amom
|-
| suffix on adj. || *pa-
|-
| sugarcane || *belam
|-
| sun/sky || *[a/o]limu
|-
| swim || *ce
|-
| tame/orphan || *ŋomo-
|-
| taro || *muj
|-
| tendon || *ouo
|-
| testicle || *oko
|-
| thigh || *c[a]pe, *cepe
|-
| throat || *bila
|-
| thumb/big toe || *ege-
|-
| tongue || *nepla
|-
| tooth || *kal
|-
| torch || *ual[e]no
|-
| tree/wood || *doio
|-
| upright || *daŋ
|-
| urine || *oŋo
|-
| voice || *wai[a]
|-
| wait || *[a]lpo
|-
| wallaby || *doki
|-
| wash || *uw
|-
| water || *iu
|-
| weep/cry || *ŋom
|-
| widow || *boi
|-
| wife || *kepi[ŋ/ɣ][e]
|-
| wing || *mama
|-
| woman/female || *iowa-
|-
| younger sibling || *uobia
|}

References

External links 

 Timothy Usher, New Guinea World, Proto-Bulaka River

 
Language families
Papuan languages
Languages of western New Guinea